Tierras Morenas is a district of the Tilarán canton, in the Guanacaste province of Costa Rica.

Geography 
Tierras Morenas has an area of  km² and an elevation of  metres.

Locations 
Poblados: Aguacate, Aguas Gatas (part), Bajo Paires, Guadalajara, Montes de Oro (part), Paraíso (part), Río Piedras, Sabalito

Demographics 

For the 2011 census, Tierras Morenas had a population of  inhabitants.

Transportation

Road transportation 
The district is covered by the following road routes:
 National Route 142
 National Route 927

References 

Districts of Guanacaste Province
Populated places in Guanacaste Province